The Hare Census is a Bulgarian satiric comedy film released in 1973, directed by Eduard Zahariev, starring Itzhak Fintzi, Nikola Todev, Georgi Rusev, Evstati Stratev, Philip Trifonov and Todor Kolev.

Although the film features one of the most remarkable Bulgarian actors, the biting satire of nonsensical activity made the authority keep the film away from the widespread presentation during the totalitarian system in Bulgaria. In the 1990s, after the advent of democracy, the film came into broad view and became an eminent badge for the Bulgarian Film Art from those years.

Plot

The daily routine in the village of Yugla is shaken by the statistician clerk Asenov (Fintzi) who come with a mission to take the census of the hares in the locality. He makes the village mayor Bay Georgi (Todev) mobilize the local men in realization of the absurd task. On the very day all the village men are in the field. The mayor, the teacher, the veterinarian... even an old man joins
the group.

Naturally all the efforts failed in fulfilling the mission since not a single hare came into sight. The undertaking ends with an open area banquet, with a grape brandy, and wine under a tree. The last episode presents Asenov leaving the village with his small noisy Russian car loaded to the top with fresh cabbage.

Production
Production company:
Studio of Featured Films (SFF) - a Film Unit MLADOST
Working title: Well-dressed Men 

Director:
Eduard Zahariev has 11 full-length films. The Hare Census is probably the most popular with them and undoubtedly the most mature. He served up serious problems  with such an irony and sarcasm developed into generalization about the lack of coincidence between reality and intentions.

Writer:
Georgi Mishev's dramaturgy  became a subject of eminent interpretations in the beginning of the 70s. His screenplays found co-authors as Eduard Zahariev, Lyudmil Kirkov, Ivan Andonov, Maya Vaptsarova who in their own way entered into the unique universe of Mishev's characters.

Director of Photography:
Venets Dimitrov did his second independent work in this film. He created memorable image of the absurd daily round of those years.

Filmed: 1973; Premiere: 30.November.1973 

The film was released on DVD in 2000s.

Cast
Itzhak Fintzi as Asenov
Nikola Todev as Bay Georgi (the village mayor)
Georgi Rusev as the veterinarian
Evstati Stratev as the village school teacher
Todor Kolev as the young hunter
Filip Trifonov as the young engineer
Maya Dragomanska as Krasimira

Response
A reported 372,813 admissions were recorded for the film in cinemas throughout Bulgaria in the 70s.

The film was subsumed among the 50 golden Bulgarian films in the book by the journalist Pencho Kovachev. The book was published in 2008 by "Zahariy Stoyanov" publishing house.

There were the following publications:
FILM ART magazine, vol. 11,1973,p. 30 - by I. Bozhinova
Otechestven Front news paper, vol.9061-05.12.1973 - by E. Vasileva
Bulgarian Film Magazine, vol.4, 1973,p. 18 - by Ya. Valchanova
Narodna Mladezh news paper, vol.290-06.12.1973 - by B. Doneva
New Films Magazine, vol.7-1975,p. 32 - by S. Ivanova
Trud news paper, vol.282-05.12.1973 - by B. Mihaylov
Film News Magazine, vol. 10-1973,p. 6 - M. Nikolova
Zemedelsko Zname news paper, vol. 5-284 - by A. Svilenov
National Culture news paper, vol. 50-08.12.1973 - by I. Stefanov
Literature Front news paper, vol. 50-13.12.1973 - by G. Chernev

Awards and honors
FBFF Varna'73 (Festival for Bulgarian Featured Films)
 Second Award for screenwriter Georgi Mishev, director Eduard Zahariev, cameraman Venets Dimitrov, composer Kiril Donchev and the actor Itzhak Fintzi
 The Critics Award with the Union of Bulgarian Filmmakers

Locarno Film Festival'74 (Swiss)
 Second Award by the international jury

Notes

References
Galina Gencheva, Bulgarian Feature Films vol.3, Dr. Petar Beron 2008 with the Bulgarian Cinematheque
Pencho Kovachev, 50 Golden Bulgarian Films, Zahariy Stoyanov 2008
Bulgarian National Film Archive 
The film in the Bulgarian National Television 
BNT Details

External links
 

Bulgarian satirical films
1970s Bulgarian-language films
1973 films
Films set in Bulgaria
Films shot in Bulgaria
Films directed by Eduard Sachariev